Lac de Villefranche-de-Panat is a lake in Aveyron, France. At an elevation of 727 m, its surface area is 1.92 km².

It lies in the communes of Villefranche-de-Panat and Alrance.

Description
The Lac de Villefranche-de-Panat is part of an electricity generating system where waters falling on the granite plateau of Lévézou that had drained unhindered into the Viaur and the Tarn river were captured and used by the power stations at Alrance and Le Pouget. 

Waters from the Vioulou fell, and waters from the Vaur were pumped into the reservoir at the Lac de Paraloup whence they passed through a 10.8 km steel lined tunnel to the Alrance power station and into the lake. Waters from three streams that fell directly into the Tarn at Le Truel, are pumped directly into the lake. From this lake tunnels were dug to the Lac de Saint-Amans where the waters drop 461m vertically to the power station at Le Pouget on the Tarn.

The Dam
This is a classic gravity type dam of earth lined with concrete.

Statistics
Height : 43 m
Volume of the earth and concrete dam : 31 500 m³
Width at the base : 29 m
Width at the crest : 2,70 m
Length of the crest : 332 m
Volume of water retained : 10,9 hm³
Evacuation in spate : 48 m³/s
Évacuation method : an overflow channel
Discharge : 11 m³/s
Discharge : 1 butterfly valve
The tunnel leading from Villefranche-de-Panat to the Lac de Saint-Amans is 3.4 m in diameter and 4,690 m long.

History
The Alrance was dammed between 1948 and 1950, which created the lake.

Leisure
The lake is used for boating, swimming, and Hydro ULM (microlight sea planes)

Villefranche De Panat